The Nipissing dialect of Ojibwe is spoken in the area of Lake Nipissing in Ontario. Representative communities in the Nipissing dialect area are Golden Lake, although the language is moribund at that location, and Maniwaki, Quebec. Although speakers of Ojibwe in the community of Kitigan Zibi (also called River Desert) at Maniwaki, Québec self-identify as Algonquin, the language spoken there is Nipissing. Maniwaki speakers were among those who migrated from Oka, Quebec. Similarly, the nineteenth-century missionary  ('Grammar of the Algonquin language') describes Nipissing speech.

The term  'those at the end of the lake' is attributed to Algonquin speakers as a term for Nipissing dialect speakers, with related  'Nipissing language', and is also cited for Southwestern Ojibwe with the meaning 'Algonquin Indian'; other sources ranging from the seventeenth to nineteenth centuries cite the same form from several different Ojibwe dialects, including Ottawa.

Speakers of this dialect generally use a French-based writing system.

Nipissing Ojibwe is not included in Ethnologue.

See also
 Nipissing First Nation
 Nipissing 10, Ontario
 Golden Lake

Notes

References

 Baraga, Frederic. 1978. A dictionary of the Otchipwe language, explained in English. A new edition, by a missionary of the Oblates. Part I, English-Otchipwe; Part II, Otchipwe-English. Montréal: Beauchemin & Valois. Reprint (in one volume), Minneapolis: Ross and Haines, 1966, 1973.
 Cuoq, Jean André. 1886. Lexique de la langue algonquine. Montréal: J. Chapleau.
 Cuoq, Jean André. 1891. Grammaire de la langue algonquine. Société royale du Canada, Mémoires 9(1): 85-114; 10(1): 41-119.
 Day, Gordon. 1978. "Nipissing." Bruce Trigger, ed., Handbook of North American Indians, Volume 15, Northeast, pp. 786–791. Washington:  Smithsonian Institution. 
 Day, Gordon and Bruce Trigger. 1978. "Algonquin." Bruce Trigger, ed., Handbook of North American Indians, Volume 15, Northeast, pp. 792–797. Washington:  Smithsonian Institution. 
 Gordon Jr., Raymond G., ed., 2005. Ethnologue: Languages of the World, 15th edition. Ethnologue: Languages of the World Dallas: Summer Institute of Linguistics.  
 McGregor, Ernest. 1987. Algonquin lexicon. Maniwaki, QC: River Desert Education Authority.
 Valentine, J. Randolph, 1994. Ojibwe dialect relationships. PhD dissertation, University of Texas, Austin.

Central Algonquian languages
Ojibwa language, Central
Indigenous languages of the North American eastern woodlands
First Nations languages in Canada